Staffordshire/Warwickshire 4 was a tier 13 English Rugby Union league with teams from Staffordshire and Warwickshire taking part.  Promoted teams moved up to Staffordshire/Warwickshire 3 and there was no relegation.  Restructuring of the Staffordshire/Warwickshire leagues at the end of the 1995–96 season meant that the league was cancelled and all teams either transferring to the Warwickshire regional division or dropping out of the leagues.

Original teams

When this division was introduced in 1992 as part of a merger of the Staffordshire and Warwickshire leagues, it contained the following teams:

Bloxwich - N/A (new to league)
Burntwood - transferred from Staffordshire 2 (7th)
Cheadle - transferred from Staffordshire 2 (8th)
Coventry Jaguar - transferred from Warwickshire 3 (7th)
Coventry Post Office - transferred from Warwickshire 3 (6th)
Ford - transferred from Warwickshire 3 (8th)
Rugby Welsh - transferred from Warwickshire 3 (9th)
Shottery - transferred from Warwickshire 3 (4th)
Stone - N/A (new to league)
Warwickshire Police - N/A (new to league)

Staffordshire/Warwickshire 4 honours

Staffordshire/Warwickshire 4 (1992–1993)

The original Staffordshire/Warwickshire 4 was a tier 12 league.  Promotion was to Staffordshire/Warwickshire 3 and there was no relegation.

Staffordshire/Warwickshire 4 (1993–1996)

The top six teams from Midlands 1 and the top six from North 1 were combined to create National 5 North, meaning that Staffordshire/Warwickshire 4 dropped to become a tier 13 league.  Promotion continued to Staffordshire/Warwickshire 3 and there was no relegation.  The division was cancelled at the end of the 1995–96 season with teams transferred into Warwickshire league or dropping out of the league altogether.

Number of league titles

Bloxwich (1)
Ford (1)
Rugby Welsh (1)
Warwickshire Police (1)

See also
Staffordshire/Warwickshire 1
Staffordshire/Warwickshire 2
Staffordshire/Warwickshire 3
Midlands RFU
Staffordshire RU
Warwickshire RFU
English rugby union system
Rugby union in England

Notes

References

Defunct rugby union leagues in England
Rugby union in Staffordshire
Rugby union in Warwickshire
Sports leagues established in 1992
Sports leagues disestablished in 1996